William Arthur Munnell (October 9, 1920 – March 1, 2013) served in the California State Assembly for the 51st district from 1951 to 1961 and during World War II he served in the United States Army. While serving in the California State Assembly he was at one point the minority and the majority leader for the Democratic Party. He also served on the Los Angeles County Superior Court from 1961 until 1985.

References

United States Army personnel of World War II
1920 births
2013 deaths
Democratic Party members of the California State Assembly
20th-century American politicians